SMART Recovery is an international non-profit organization that provides assistance to individuals seeking abstinence from addiction. SMART stands for Self-Management and Recovery Training. The SMART approach  is secular and research-based, using cognitive behavioral therapy (CBT) and non-confrontational motivational methods.

SMART Recovery is an alternative to Alcoholics Anonymous (AA) and other twelve-step programs. SMART differs from AA in that addiction is viewed by the organization as a dysfunctional habit, rather than a disease as it is framed in AA, while allowing that it is possible that certain people have a predisposition toward addictive behavior. SMART Recovery does not focus on spiritual growth as a key component of behavior modification and thus does not encourage individuals to admit powerlessness over addictions, nor use the concept of a "Higher Power".

History 
After Jack Trimpey, founder of Rational Recovery (RR), decided to turn RR into a for-profit organization, the organization's board of directors left and formed SMART Recovery.  Incorporated in 1992 as the Alcohol and Drug Abuse Self-Help Network (ADASHN), the organization began operating under the SMART Recovery name in 1994.

General operations are overseen by a volunteer board of directors, which initially included Joseph Gerstein, MD, A. Thomas Horvath, PhD, Philip Tate, PhD, Peter Bishop, PhD, Ann Parmenter, F. Michler Bishop, PhD, Robert Dain, PhD, Rich Dowling, Vince Fox, Marc Kern, PhD, Hank Robb, PhD, and Robert Sarmiento, PhD  Local groups are run by volunteers known as "facilitators" with the assistance of volunteer recovery professionals called "volunteer advisors". A central office is currently maintained in Mentor, Ohio.

SMART Recovery offers its services for free. Donations are encouraged, and its publications are sold.

Methodology 
SMART Recovery is based on scientific knowledge and is intended to evolve as scientific knowledge evolves.  The program uses principles of motivational interviewing, found in motivational enhancement therapy (MET), and techniques taken from rational emotive behavior therapy (REBT), and cognitive-behavioral therapy (CBT), as well as scientifically validated research on treatment. The SMART Recovery Program and meetings are congenial to participants who choose to use appropriately-prescribed medications, including opioid-agonist medications, as part of their recovery programs.

The organization's program emphasizes four areas, called the 4-Point Program, in the process of recovery: Building Motivation, Coping with Urges, Problem Solving, and Lifestyle Balance. The "SMART Toolbox" is a collection of various MET, CBT and REBT methods, or "tools", which address the 4 Points.

SMART Recovery can be used as a stand-alone primary recovery support program for those seeking help recovering from addictions but does not insist on being exclusive. The program does not use the twelve steps that make up the basis of the various "Anonymous" self-help groups (e.g., Alcoholics Anonymous (AA), Narcotics Anonymous (NA), etc.) and is generally listed as an "Alternative to AA" or an "Alternative to the Twelve Steps." SMART Recovery believes that each individual finds his and her own path to recovery. Though listed as an "alternative", it is also suggested as a possible "supplement" to twelve-step programs in SMART Recovery's main program publication, The SMART Recovery Handbook.

Stages of change 
SMART Recovery recognizes that participants may be in one or more of various stages of change and that different exercises may be helpful at different stages.
Precontemplation – At this stage, the participant may not realize that they have a problem.
Contemplation – The participant evaluates the advantages and disadvantages of the addiction by performing a cost/benefit analysis.
Determination/Preparation – The participant decides to pursue personal change, and may complete a Change Plan Worksheet.
Action – The participant seeks out new ways of handling their addiction behavior. This can include self-help, the support of addiction help group or professional guidance.
Maintenance – After a few months, the participant's behavior has been changed and now seeks to maintain their gains.
Graduation/Exit – Once a participant has sustained a long period of change, they may choose to move on with their lives and "graduate" from SMART Recovery.
Side event: Relapse – Although not inevitable, relapses are a normal part of the change cycle and if handled well, can serve as a learning experience in overcoming an addiction.

Meetings 
The meetings are free for all wishing to attend and are intended to be informational as well as supportive. Over 1500 weekly group meetings led by volunteer facilitators are held worldwide. In addition, the organization provides online resources and support to the volunteers and those attending the groups and one or more daily online meetings.

Meetings are also held in correctional facilities in many states including: Arizona, California, Florida, Indiana, Maryland, Massachusetts, Michigan, Minnesota, Missouri, New Jersey, New York, Vermont, Virginia, Washington, and Wisconsin.

SMART Family & Friends 
SMART Family & Friends is an online or face-to-face support group for Concerned Significant Others (CSOs) of people struggling with addictions. The group was started in September 2010. Its purpose is to address specific issues encountered when a family member or friend tries to reach out and help a loved one and it draws from the work of Robert Meyers' community reinforcement approach and family training (CRAFT) program, which differs significantly from Al-Anon in that it is a behavioral program which advocates that the CSO can have a positive impact on the person using substances. The CRAFT program has been demonstrated in Meyers' research to be more effective than the Vernon Johnson-type intervention or Al-Anon, with less negative side-effects and better outcomes, whether or not the person using substances enters treatment.

Effectiveness 
A 2018 longitudinal study compared the self-reported success of SMART Recovery, LifeRing Secular Recovery, Women for Sobriety, and Alcoholics Anonymous.  After normalizing for income and other demographic factors, the study saw that SMART Recovery fared worse across the outcomes of alcohol abstinence, alcohol drinking problems, and total abstinence, compared to Alcoholics Anonymous. However, after normalizing for treatment goal, SMART Recovery members who pursued abstinence did as well across all three factors as members of AA.  In other words, among AA members and members of SMART Recovery who wanted to abstain, there was no significant difference in the success rate.

Recognition 
SMART is recognized by the American Academy of Family Physicians, as well as the National Institute on Drug Abuse (NIDA) and the National Institute on Alcohol Abuse and Alcoholism (NIAAA). NIDA and NIAAA are agencies of the National Institutes of Health (NIH), a component of the U.S. Department of Health and Human Services.

See also 

Addiction recovery groups
Alcoholism
Cognitive-behavioral therapy (CBT)
Community reinforcement approach and family training (CRAFT)
Drug addiction
LifeRing Secular Recovery
Rational emotive behavior therapy (REBT)
Rational Recovery
Secular Organizations for Sobriety (SOS)
Women for Sobriety

References

Further reading 

Brown JM. (1998) Self-Regulation and the Addictive Behaviors. in Treating Addictive Behaviors, 2nd ed. Miller WR & Heather N. eds. Plenum Press, NY. 
Ellis A. & Velten E. (1992) Rational Steps To Quitting Alcohol: When AA Doesn't Work For You. Barricade Books, NY. 
Gerstein J. (1998) Rational Recovery, SMART Recovery and non-twelve step recovery programs. In Principles Of Addiction Medicine, 2nd ed. American Society of Addiction Medicine, Chevy Chase 
Mattson ME. (1998) Finding the Right Approach. in Miller WR & Heather N. Treating Addictive Behaviors. 2nd ed. Plenum Press, NY. 
Myers PL. (2002) Beware of the Man of One Book: Processing Ideology in Addictions Education. J of Teaching in the Addictions. pp 1:69-90
Vuchinich RE & Tucker JA. (1998) Choice, Behavioral Economics, and Addictive Behavior Patterns. in Treating Addictive Behaviors

External links 
 

Addiction organizations in the United States
Support groups
Organizations established in 1992
Mentor, Ohio
Positive mental attitude
Psychiatric rehabilitation
Mental health organizations in Ohio